Shaban Opolot (1924 – 6 March 2005) was a Ugandan military officer. He served as Uganda Army Commander from 1964 to 1966.

Early life 
Shaban Opolot was born in 1924 in Namusi Nakaloke, Uganda. He could speak multiple languages, including Luganda. He was a Muslim of Teso ethnicity.

Military career 
In 1945 Opolot enlisted in the King's African Rifles in Mbale. He was assigned to the Infantry Training Centre in Jinja for training. Upon its completion, he was posted to the 7th Battalion in Nairobi. The unit saw service in Mauritius. In 1949, Opolot was promoted to the rank of warrant officer. Three years later he went to the United Kingdom for further military training.

Following a mutiny in 1964, Opolot was appointed Uganda Army Commander and chief of staff. Opolot was supportive of Mutesa II of Buganda who served as Ugandan President at the time. In January and February 1966, Opolot ordered troop movements in support of Mutesa during the Mengo Crisis that pitted the President against Prime Minister Milton Obote. The commander's orders proved abortive as the army was mostly loyal to his deputy Idi Amin, an ally of Obote. On 23 February 1966, Obote made Opolot Chief of Defence Staff, effectively removing him from control of the army.  He was later imprisoned by the Obote government. By the end of his military career, he had risen to brigadier.

Later life 
Obote was overthrown during the 1971 Ugandan coup d'état. The new Ugandan President, Idi Amin, released Opolot from prison. From 1973 to 1975 Opolot served as Uganda's High Commissioner to Ghana. Upon his return to Uganda, he retired to the east of the country. Opolot died on 6 March 2005 at the age of 86 after a long battle with prostate cancer in Mbale District. He was buried the next day in Kireka Village, Nakaloke Sub-County, Mbale District.

References

Works cited 
 

Ugandan military personnel
1924 births
2005 deaths
Ugandan Muslims
People from Sironko District
King's African Rifles officers
Teso people
Deaths from prostate cancer
Deaths from cancer in Uganda